Jorge Mario Varlotta Levrero (23 January 1940 - 30 August 2004), better known as Mario Levrero, was a Uruguayan author. He authored nearly 20 novels as well as writing articles, columns, comic books and crosswords. His work is said to be influenced by Franz Kafka, Lewis Carroll and surrealism. Throughout his life he shunned publicity and was difficult with interviewers. Regardless, he became a cult figure in Uruguay and Argentina.

His writing was often branded as science fiction or genre fiction, a categorisation he strongly rejected. Critics have commented on the both sinister and humorous nature of his work.

Biography 
Levrero was born in Montevideo in 1940 to an Italian-Uruguayan family. He stopped attending school at age 14 due to a heart murmur and instead spent his time in bed, reading and listening to tango music.Having never finished school, he claimed that attending a tango club was his university. In his twenties, he ran a secondhand bookshop with a friend and was briefly a member of the Communist Party of Uruguay's youth wing. His first short stories were published in science fiction magazines in Buenos Aires.
In 1966, Levrero wrote his first novel La ciudad (The City). He claimed the book was his attempt to "translate Kafka into Uruguayan". Published in 1970, the novel became part of what he described as an "involuntary trilogy" along with Paris (1980) and El lugar (1982). By the 1980s, Levrero was gaining more mainstream recognition after receiving an award for his novella Desplazamientos.

Levrero received a Guggenheim Grant in 2000 to finish work on a project he had begun in 1984 that he called La novela luminosa. Intended to be an account of a transcendental experience, the posthumously published work ended up as a composite of a diary detailing failed attempts at writing the novel and unedited chapters of the incomplete novel. It is widely regarded as his masterpiece.

Levrero died in Montevideo in 2004.

Levrero's work has inspired Latin American writers such as Rodolfo Fogwill, César Aira and Alejandro Zambra.

Work

Novels
 
 Caza de conejos, 2012 
 Dejen todo en mis manos, 1998 
 Diario de un canalla/Burdeos, 1972 
 El alma de Gardel, 1996 
 El discurso vacío, 1996
 El lugar, 1982 
 Fauna/Desplazamientos, 1987 
 La Banda del Ciempiés, 1989 
 La Banda del Ciempiés, 2015
 La ciudad, 1970 
 La novela luminosa, 2005 
 Nick Carter se divierte mientras el lector es asesinado y yo agonizo y otras novelas, 2012
 París, 1980 
 Trilogía involuntaria (includes La ciudad, París, and El lugar), 2008

Short Stories
 
 Aguas salobres, 1983 
 Cuentos completos, 2019 
 El portero y el otro, 1992 
 Espacios libres, 1987 
 La máquina de pensar en Gladys, 1970 
 Los carros de fuego, 2003 
 Los muertos, 1986 
 Todo el tiempo, 1982 
 Ya que estamos, 2001

Comic books
 
 Historietas reunidas de Jorge Varlotta, 2016 
 Los profesionales, with artwork by Lizán, 1988 
 Santo Varón/I, with artwork by Lizán, 1986

Other writings
 
 Caza de conejos, 1986 
 Irrupciones I, 2001 
 Irrupciones II, 2001
 Manual de parapsicología, 1978

References

1940 births
2004 deaths
Uruguayan science fiction writers
Uruguayan short story writers